Umm al-Amad (also spelled Umm al-Amed) is a village in central Syria, administratively part of the Homs Governorate. Nearby towns include al-Mukharram to the east, al-Mukharram al-Tahtani to the northeast, Danibah to the north, and al-Mishirfeh to the east. According to the Central Bureau of Statistics, Umm al-Amad had a population of 2,851. Its inhabitants are predominantly Shia Muslims.

References

Populated places in al-Mukharram District
Shia Muslim communities in Syria